Lunch Wagon (also known as Lunch Wagon Girls) is a 1981 sex comedy starring Pamela Jean Bryant, Rosanne Katon, and Candy Moore.

The film was directed by Ernest Pintoff and written by Marshall Harvey and Terrie Frankel and  Leon Phillips. Mayor Bradley declared "Lunch Wagon Day" for the opening, and there was a parade of over 80 Lunch Wagons down Hollywood Boulevard. The film was very popular with teens and was the largest grossing independent movie of 1981.

Synopsis
Three women start a lunch wagon business, but run into resistance from their competitor Mr. Schmeckler (Rick Podell) when their business starts interfering with illegal activity that Schmeckler is involved in. While Schmeckler busies himself trying to sabotage their wagon, the women are busy falling in love with construction workers and rock stars. Meanwhile, two bumbling diamond thieves create complications for both sides. The film was the first major exposure for the band Missing Persons, credited here as "U.S. Drag", with their songs "Mental Hopscotch" and "I Like Boys" featuring prominently on the soundtrack.

References

External links

1981 films
1980s sex comedy films
1980s crime films
American sex comedy films
1980s English-language films
Films directed by Ernest Pintoff
1981 comedy films
1980s American films